Marguerite Jacquelin (1850s – 1 February 1941) was a French flower painter.

Jacquelin was born in Paris and trained with the painters Louis-Auguste Auguin, Léon Bonnat, Maxime Lalanne, and Joseph Nicolas Robert-Fleury. She showed works at the Paris Salon from 1879.

Jacquelin moved to Bordeaux by 1937, where she exhibited works along with her sister Marthe at the Salon there, listing their address as "Rue Emile-Zola 2".

References

Marguerite Jacquelin on artnet

1850s births
1941 deaths
Painters from Paris
19th-century French painters
French women painters
Flower artists
Académie Julian alumni
19th-century French women artists
20th-century French painters
20th-century French women artists